Sculptors Guild, a society of sculptors who banded together to promote public interest in contemporary sculpture, was founded in 1937. Signatories to the original corporation papers (Sculptors Guild, Inc.) were Sonia Gordon Brown, Berta Margoulies, Aaron Goodelman, Chaim Gross (who became the first President), Minna Harkavy, Milton Horn, Concetta Scaravaglione, Warren Wheelock, and William Zorach. The inaugural exhibit of the Guild was held April 12 - May 31, 1938, on a vacant lot at Park Avenue and 39th St. This outdoor exhibit, the first of its kind in New York City, hosted 40,000 visitors paying an admission price of ten cents to view the work. Owing to the tremendous success of this first exhibit, the Brooklyn Museum held an exhibit of contemporary American sculpture by Guild members, October 21- November 27, 1938.  

The 58 founding members of the Sculptors Guild were:

Saul Baizerman
Aaron Ben-Shmuel
Simone Brangier Boas
Sonia Gordon Brown
Harold Cash
Albino Cavalito
Cornellia Van A. Chapin
Robert Cronbach
Louise Cross
John Cunningham
Alice Decker
Jose de Creeft
Jean De Marco
Jose De Rivera
Hunt Diederich
Alfeo Faggi
Herbert Ferber
Paul Fiene
John Bernard Flannagan
Hy Freilicher
Mark Freidman
Eugenie Gershoy
Enrico Glicenstein
Maurice Glickman
Vincent Glinsky
Aaron Goodelman
Dorothea Greenbaum
Chaim Gross (first President)
Genevieve Karr Hamlin
Minna Harkavy
Alonzo Hauser
Milton Hebald
Milton Horn
John Hovannes
Margaret Brassler Kane
Nathaniel Kaz
Oronzio Maldarelli
Paul Manship
Berta Margoulies (first Secretary)
Dina Melicov
George Meyers
David Michnick
Ward Montague
Hugo Robus
Marion Sanford
Hélène Sardeau
Concetta Scaravaglione
Louis Slobodkin
Cesare Stea
Mary Tarleton
T. Trajan
Polygnotos Vagis
Marion Walton
Nat Werner
Anita Weschler (first Treasurer)
Warren Wheelock
Adolf Wolff
Sreekumar Unnikrishnan
William Zorach
 

The Sculptors Guild continues today as an advocacy organization with a diverse membership. Activities have expanded to include the annual “dressing” of the windows of Saks 5th Avenue, NYC, and participation in exhibitions abroad, such as the 1993 exhibition in Kyoto, Japan, and the 2008 international art fairs at Art Cologne and Supermarket Stockholm. The Sculptors Guild has a presence on New York’s historic Governors Island, with annual indoor and outdoor exhibitions, carving workshops and gallery talks. In 2010 the Sculptors Guild opened a gallery space and office on the second floor in Dumbo, Brooklyn. In September 2016, they moved into an office space on the second floor at the Renee and Chaim Gross Foundation, in Greenwich Village at 256 LaGuardia Place, NY, NY 10012 and continue to have summer exhibitions on Governors Island. 

2017 will be the Sculptor Guild's 80th year, and will be celebrated with a momentous member exhibition curated by John Yau at the historic Westbeth Gallery for the month of February. This exhibition will include past and current members highlighting the vast forms of sculpture members have explored over past 80 years. 

Membership is by invitation and/or submission to the Admissions Committee.

See also
:Category:Sculptors Guild members

References

American artist groups and collectives
American sculpture
Arts organizations established in 1937
1937 establishments in the United States